The 2022 Austrian motorcycle Grand Prix (officially known as the CryptoData Motorrad Grand Prix von Österreich) was the thirteenth round of the 2022 Grand Prix motorcycle racing season and the fifth round of the 2022 MotoE World Cup. All races (except MotoE race 1 which was held on 20 August) were held at the Red Bull Ring in Spielberg on 21 August 2022.

Background

Track layout changes
The Grand Prix used a new layout of the Red Bull Ring, wherein a chicane was added to the previous fast slight-left hander of turn 2. This was done to improve the overall safety of the track by greatly minimizing the speed the riders take the turn. The final configuration was chosen among 15 proposals, with the track being 30 meters longer than the previous configurations.

Riders' entries 
In the MotoGP class, Stefan Bradl continues to replace Marc Márquez in the Repsol Honda Team, Lorenzo Savadori runs as a wildcard with Aprilia for the fourth time in this championship. In the Moto2 class Sam Lowes was forced to miss the Grand Prix due to the dislocation of his left shoulder, and later further checks also revealed a fracture in the upper part of the humerus. To replace him on the Kalex of the Elf Marc VDS Racing Team is the seventeen year old Australian Senna Agius. To replace Gabriel Rodrigo, the Pertamina Mandalika SAG Team has chosen to have the 23 year old Japanese Taiga Hada race on his Kalex from this race until the end of the season. Rory Skinner races for the second consecutive race as a wild card with the American Racing Kalex. In the Moto3 class, Joel Kelso returns to the CIP Green Power KTM, while Nicola Carraro continues to replace Matteo Bertelle on the QJmotor Avintia Racing Team KTM. In the MotoE class, Xavier Cardelús returns to the Avintia Esponsorama Racing's Energica after missing the two races in the Dutch TT.

MotoGP Championship standings before the race 
After the British Grand Prix, Fabio Quartararo maintains the lead in the riders' standings with 180 points, plus 22 over Aleix Espargaró. Francesco Bagnaia (winner at Silverstone, 131 points) and Enea Bastianini (118 points), overtake Johann Zarco, now fifth with 114 points. In the constructors' classification, Ducati dominated with 271 points; followed by Yamaha (180 points), Aprilia (175 points), KTM (131 points), Suzuki (110 points) and Honda (88 points). In the team standings, there are only two distances between Aprilia Racing (first at 240 points) and Ducati Lenovo Team (second at 238 points), with the latter having overtaken Monster Energy Yamaha MotoGP, now third with 206 points. Prima Pramac Racing and Red Bull KTM Factory Racing are fourth and fifth with 195 and 179 points respectively.

Moto2 Championship standings before the race 
The victory in the previous Grand Prix allowed Augusto Fernández to conquer the leadership of the riders' standings and he is at 171 points with a 13 point advantage over Ai Ogura and 15 points over Celestino Vietti, the previous leader; Arón Canet is fourth with 127 points, plus 19 over Tony Arbolino. The constructors' classification reads: Kalex 300 points, Boscoscuro (who at Silverstone with Alonso López climbed on the podium with his bike for the first time this season) 77 points, MV Agusta 5 points. In the team standings, Red Bull KTM Ajo leads with 246 points, with a lead of 16 points over Idemitsu Honda Team Asia, 49 over Flexbox HP40, 87 over Elf Marc VDS Racing Team and 90 over Mooney VR46 Racing Team.

Moto3 Championship standings before the race 
The retirements of Sergio García and Izan Guevara, combined with his victory at Silverstone, allow Dennis Foggia to reduce the distance in the riders' standings; García is first at 182 points, with only three points ahead of Guevara, and 42 over Foggia. Jaume Masià and Deniz Öncü are fourth and fifth with 127 and 114 points respectively. In the constructors' classification, Gas Gas leads with 235 points, followed by Honda (206 points), KTM (194 points), Husqvarna (142 points) and CFMoto (101 points). The team classification sees Gaviota GasGas Aspar Team clearly in the lead with 361 points, plus 127 on Leopard Racing; third Red Bull KTM Ajo with 175 points, preceding Sterilgarda Husqvarna Max (146 points) and Red Bull KTM Tech3 (143 points).

MotoE Cup standings before the race 
Dominique Aegerter leads the standings ahead of this Grand Prix with 158 points, with a lead of 31.5 points over Eric Granado, 45.5 over Matteo Ferrari, 60 over Mattia Casadei and 79 over Miquel Pons.

Free practice

MotoGP 
The first session, held in wet-dry conditions, saw Jack Miller as the fastest ahead of Johann Zarco and Joan Mir. In the second session, the roles are reversed between Zarco and Miller, with Jorge Martín third. The French driver confirms himself as the fastest also in the third session, ahead of his compatriot Fabio Quartararo and Miller.

Combinated Free Practice 1-2-3 
The top ten riders (written in bold) qualified in Q2.

Free Practice 4 
Enea Bastianini finished at the top of the standings, followed by Luca Marini and Francesco Bagnaia.

MotoE 
Mattia Casadei was the fastest in both free practice sessions. In the first, held in the wet, he preceded Niccolò Canepa and Eric Granado. In the second, in the dry, he is followed in the standings by Dominique Aegerter and Granado.

The top eight riders (written in bold) qualified in Q2.

Qualifying

MotoGP

Moto2

Moto3

MotoE

Race

MotoGP

Moto2

Moto3

MotoE

Race 1 

Notes:
 Alessio Finello, who fell in FP1, suffered multiple fractures in his right foot and was forced to miss the Grand Prix.
All bikes manufactured by Energica.

Race 2 

Notes:
 Xavi Forés was in the final starting list but did not start the race. His place on the grid was left vacant.
 Bradley Smith suffered a fractured foot during race 1 and withdrew for race 2.
 Alessio Finello, who fell in FP1, suffered multiple fractures in his right foot and was forced to miss the Grand Prix.
All bikes manufactured by Energica.

Championship standings after the race
Below are the standings for the top five riders, constructors, and teams after the round.

MotoGP

Riders' Championship standings

Constructors' Championship standings

Teams' Championship standings

Moto2

Riders' Championship standings

Constructors' Championship standings

Teams' Championship standings

Moto3

Riders' Championship standings

Constructors' Championship standings

Teams' Championship standings

MotoE

References

External links

2022 MotoGP race reports
motorcycle Grand Prix
2022
Austrian motorcycle Grand Prix